St Columb Major was an electoral division of Cornwall in the United Kingdom which returned one member to sit on Cornwall Council from 2013 to 2021. It was abolished at the 2021 local elections, being succeeded by St Columb Major, St Mawgan and St Wenn.

Councillors

Extent
St Columb Major covered the town of St Columb Major, the villages of Ruthvoes, Talskiddy, Tregonetha and St Wenn, and the hamlets of Trebudannon, Tregaswith, Trekenning, Tregatillian, Gluvian, Winnard's Perch and Rosenannon. The hamlet of Black Cross was shared with the St Enoder division. The division covered 6350 hectares in total.

Election results

2017 election

2013 election

References

St Columb Major
Electoral divisions of Cornwall Council